Woodrow Lawrence, also popularly known as Woody, was a swimmer at the 1996 Summer Olympics in Atlanta for his country of birth Dominica. Woody finished 60th out of 63 competitors in 50 meter freestyle, with a time of 27.88 seconds.

References

External links
Dominican Olympic team homepage

Living people
Year of birth missing (living people)
Dominica male freestyle swimmers
Olympic swimmers of Dominica
Swimmers at the 1996 Summer Olympics